Alessandro Pagani (born 3 January 1937) is an Italian Roman Catholic bishop.

Ordained to the priesthood on 13 March 1965, Pagani was named bishop of the Roman Catholic Diocese of Mangochi, Malawi on 3 April 2007 and retired on 6 December 2013.

References 

1937 births
Living people
Clergy from the Province of Bergamo
Italian Roman Catholic bishops in Africa
Roman Catholic bishops of Mangochi
Place of birth missing (living people)